Parchtitz is a municipality in the Vorpommern-Rügen district, in Mecklenburg-Vorpommern, Germany.

Geography and transport 
Parchtitz is about 3 kilometres northwest of Bergen auf Rügen and lies on the Duwenbeek, the only large stream on Rügen. The stream's source is the lake of Nonnensee, which also lies within Parchtitz and which was re-established in 1993 after a long period of being drained. The village lies immediately on the Landesstraße 30 from Bergen to Gingst. The B 96 and the railway line from Stralsund to Sassnitz runs east of the village.

Villages 
The following villages fall within the municipality:

Parchtitz
Boldevitz
Gademow
Muglitz
Neuendorf
Platvitz
Reischvitz
Volkshagen
Willihof

References

External links
Official website of Parchtitz

Towns and villages on Rügen